José da Silva Pais (25 October 1679 in Lisbon – 14 November 1760 in Lisbon) was a Portuguese soldier, military engineer and colonial administrator in the Portuguese colony of Brazil.

He was involved in diverse situations in the disputed territories between the Portuguese and Spanish in the territory that today is the South region in Brazil. He organized the support for the Sacramento Colony during the Spanish–Portuguese War (1735–1737), and went head-to-head with his Spanish rival, Don Pedro de Ceballos Cortez y Calderón.

For the purpose of maintaining the southern territory in the hands of Portugal, Pais founded the city of Rio Grande in 1737 and projected and built the Fort Jesus Maria e José. That area was the object of the Spanish incursions commanded by Pedro de Ceballos, who invaded it twice.

On Santa Catarina Island, when it was in Spanish hands under the authority of Pedro de Ceballos, the Brigadier General Pais invaded and took the island for Portugal, placing himself as governor. He remained governor of the captaincy of Santa Catarina from 1739 until 1745.

He planned the construction of forts which would constitute the defense of Santa Catarina Island: in the north, Fortaleza de São José da Ponta Grossa, Fortaleza de Santa Cruz de Anhatomirim, and Fortaleza de Santo António de Ratones; and in the south: Fortaleza de Nossa Senhora da Conceição de Araçatuba.

Further reading
 Piazza, Walter F. (1988) O Brigadeiro José da Silva Paes: Estruturador do Brasil meridional.  Editora da Furg.

External links
  Uruguaiana website
  O Mate no Rio Grande do Sul

1679 births
1760 deaths
People from Lisbon
Portuguese colonization of the Americas
Portuguese colonial governors and administrators
17th-century Portuguese military personnel
Portuguese city founders
18th-century Portuguese military personnel
Brazilian city founders